Phoenicocoris dissimilis is a species of plant bugs belonging to the family Miridae, subfamily Phylinae that can be found in Denmark, France, Germany, Poland, Norway, Romania, Slovakia, Spain, and  Ukraine.

References

Insects described in 1878
Hemiptera of Europe
Miridae